The 1999–2000 St. Bonaventure Bonnies men's basketball team represented St. Bonaventure University during the 1999–2000 NCAA Division I men's basketball season. The Bonnies, led by 8th-year head coach Jim Baron, played their home games at the Reilly Center and were members of the Atlantic 10 Conference. They finished the season 21–10, 11–5 in A-10 to finish in second place. They lost to Temple in the championship game of the A-10 Basketball tournament, but did earn an at-large bid to the 2000 NCAA tournament where they lost in the opening round to Kentucky, 85–80 in 2OT.

Roster

Schedule and results

|-
!colspan=9 style=| Regular season

|-
!colspan=9 style=| A-10 tournament

|-
!colspan=9 style=| NCAA tournament

References

St. Bonaventure Bonnies men's basketball seasons
St. Bonaventure
St. Bonaventure
St. Bonaventure Bonnies men's basketball
St. Bonaventure Bonnies men's basketball